Gordon Dennis Pembery (10 October 1926 – 12 March 2013) was a Welsh footballer who played as a wing half in the Football League.  He was born in Cardiff, Glamorganshire, Wales.

References

External links

1926 births
2013 deaths
Welsh footballers
Footballers from Cardiff
Association football midfielders
Charlton Athletic F.C. players
Norwich City F.C. players
Cardiff City F.C. players
Torquay United F.C. players
Swindon Town F.C. players
Oxford United F.C. players
English Football League players